No religion may refer to:

Irreligion, absence of, or indifference towards religion
Atheism, the absence of belief of the existence of deities
Agnosticism, the position that the existence of deities is unknown or unknowable
No Religious Test Clause, found in Article VI, paragraph 3 of the U.S. Constitution
"No Religion", a song by Van Morrison from his album Days Like This